The 2015 BET Hip Hop Awards were held on October 9, 2015 and will air on October 13, 2015 at Atlanta Civic Center. The nominations were announced on September 15, 2015. Snoop Dogg will be the event's host again. Canadian rapper Drake leads the nominations again with 12 nominations. Just behind Drake are Big Sean with 10 nods, Kanye West and Nicki Minaj with 9. Kendrick Lamar and J. Cole are up for 8 awards.

Performances 
Future – "Where Ya At" and "March Madness
Young Dro featuring T.I. – "We in the City"
Kid Ink featuring Dej Loaf, and DJ Mustard – "Be Real"
Puff Daddy & the Family featuring Lil' Kim, Styles P, and King Los – "Workin'"
Rich Homie Quan – "Flex (Ooh, Ooh, Ooh)"
Travis Scott – "90210" and "Antidote"
O.T. Genasis – "CoCo"
iLoveMemphis – "Hit the Quan"

Cyphers
Pre-Show Cypher – Tripz, Muggsy Malone & Albe Black
Cypher 1 – Charles Hamilton, Jackie Spade, Joyner Lucas & Tink
Cypher 2 – Erick Sermon, Redman & Keith Murray of Def Squad
Cypher 3 – King Mez, J-Doe, Raury, Casey Veggies & Vince Staples
Cypher 4 – Lin-Manuel Miranda, Renée Elise Goldsberry, Daveed Diggs, Black Thought & Questlove
Cypher 5 – Doug E. Fresh, Nicole Paris & Rahzel
Live Cypher – T-Top, Rain, Charlie Clips, DNA & K-Shine

Nominations and winners

Best Hip Hop Video 
Kendrick Lamar - "Alright"
Big Sean featuring Chris Brown & Ty Dolla $ign - "Play No Games"
Big Sean featuring Drake & Kanye West - "Blessings"
Fetty Wap - "Trap Queen" 
Nicki Minaj featuring Beyoncé - "Feeling Myself"

Best Collabo, Duo or Group 
Big Sean featuring Drake & Kanye West - "Blessings"
Big Sean featuring E-40 - "I Don't F**k with You"
Fetty Wap featuring Monty - "My Way"
Nicki Minaj featuring Beyoncé - "Feeling Myself"
Nicki Minaj featuring Drake & Lil Wayne - "Truffle Butter"

Best Live Performer 
J. Cole
 Drake
 Kanye West
 Kendrick Lamar
 Nicki Minaj

Lyricist of the Year 
Kendrick Lamar
 Big Sean
 Drake
 J. Cole
 Nicki Minaj

Video Director of the Year  
Benny Boom
Alan Ferguson
 Chris Robinson
 Colin Tilley
 Director X

DJ of the Year 
DJ Mustard
 DJ Drama
 DJ Envy
 DJ Esco
 DJ Khaled

Producer of the Year 
DJ Mustard
 J. Cole
 Kanye West
 Mike WiLL Made It
 Pharrell
 Timbaland

MVP of the Year 
Drake
 Big Sean
 Future
 J. Cole
 Kendrick Lamar
 Nicki Minaj

Track of the Year 
Only the producer of the track nominated in this category.
"Trap Queen" - Produced By Tony Fadd (Fetty Wap)
"Alright" - Produced By Pharrell Williams & Sounwave (Kendrick Lamar)
"Blessings" - Produced By Boi-1da & Vinylz (Big Sean featuring Drake & Kanye West)
"Commas" - Produced By DJ Spinz & Southside (Future)
"I Don't F**k with You" - Produced By DJ Dahi, DJ Mustard, Kanye West & Key Wane (Big Sean featuring E-40)

Album of the Year 
J. Cole - 2014 Forest Hills Drive
Big Sean - Dark Sky Paradise
Drake - If You're Reading This It's Too Late
Kendrick Lamar - To Pimp A Butterfly
Nicki Minaj - The Pinkprint
Wale - The Album About Nothing

Who Blew Up Award 
Fetty Wap
Bobby Shmurda
DeJ Loaf
Rae Sremmurd
Tink

Hustler of the Year 
Drake
 Dr. Dre
 J. Cole
 Jay-Z
 Nicki Minaj

Made-You-Look Award 
DeJ Loaf
 A$AP Rocky
 Drake
 Kanye West
Nicki Minaj

Best Hip Hop Online Site 
Worldstarhiphop.Com

Allhiphop.Com
Complex.Com
Hotnewhiphop.Com
Rapradar.Com

Best Club Banger 
Big Sean featuring E-40 - "I Don't F**k with You" (Produced By DJ Dahi, DJ Mustard, Kanye West & Key Wane)
DeJ Loaf - "Try Me" (Produced By DDS)
Fetty Wap - "Trap Queen" (Produced By Tony Fadd)
Future - "Commas" (Produced By DJ Spinz & Southside)
Rich Homie Quan - "Flex (Ooh, Ooh, Ooh)" (Produced By DJ Spinz & Nitti Beatz)

Best Mixtape 
Future - 56 Nights
Future - Beast Mode
Future - Monster
Lil Wayne - Sorry 4 the Wait 2
Travi$ Scott - Days Before Rodeo

Sweet 16: Best Featured Verse 
Drake - "My Way Remix" (Fetty Wap Featuring Drake)
Drake - "Blessings" (Big Sean Featuring Drake & Kanye West)
E-40 - "I Don't F**k with You" (Big Sean Featuring E-40)
Kendrick Lamar - "Classic Man Remix" (Jidenna featuring Kendrick Lamar)
Lil Wayne - "Truffle Butter" (Nicki Minaj featuring Drake & Lil Wayne)

Impact Track 
Kendrick Lamar - "Alright"
Big Sean featuring Kanye West & John Legend - "One Man Can Change The World"
Common & John Legend - "Glory" (From The Motion Picture Selma)
J. Cole - "Apparently"
J. Cole - "Be Free"

People's Champ Award 
Big Sean featuring Drake & Kanye West - "Blessings"
Fetty Wap - "Trap Queen" 
Future - "Commas" 
Kendrick Lamar - "i"
Rae Sremmurd - "No Type"
Rich Homie Quan - "Flex (Ooh, Ooh, Ooh)"

I Am Hip Hop Award 
Scarface

References

BET Hip Hop Awards
2015 music awards